Sukinda (Sl. No.: 54) is a Vidhan Sabha constituency of Jajpur district, Odisha.

Area of this constituency includes Sukinda block and Danagadi block.

Elected Members

17 elections held during 1951 to 2019 including a by-election in 1955. Elected members from the Sukinda constituency are:
2019: (54): Pritiranjan Gharai (BJD)
2014: (54): Pritiranjan Gharai (BJD)
2009: (54): Prafulla Chandra Ghadai (BJD)
2004: (23): Prafulla Chandra Ghadai (BJD) 
2000: (23): Prafulla Chandra Ghadai (BJD) 
1995: (23): Prafulla Chandra Ghadai (Janata Dal) 
1990: (23): Prafulla Chandra Ghadai (Janata Dal) 
1985: (23): Sarat Rout (Congress)
1980: (23): Sarat Rout (Congress-I)
1977: (23): Ananda Manjari Devi (Janata Party)
1974: (23): Sanatan Deo (Congress)
1971: (22): Sanatan Deo (Utkal Congress)
1967: (22): Ananda Manjari Devi (Forward Bloc)
1961: (117):  Baidhar Singh (CPI)
1955: (61, By poll): N. C. Pati (Praja Socialist Party)
1951: (61): Pitambar Bhupati Harichandan Mohapatra (Independent)

Summary of results of the 2019 Election 
In 2019 election, Biju Janata Dal candidate Pritiranjan Gharai defeated Bharatiya Janata Party candidate Pradeep Bal Samanta by a margin of 16,730 votes.

Summary of results of the 2014 Election 
In 2014 election, Biju Janata Dal candidate Pritiranjan Gharai defeated Indian National Congress candidate Sarat Raut by a margin of 4,704 votes.

Summary of results of the 2009 Election
In 2009 election, Biju Janata Dal candidate Prafulla Chandra Ghadai defeated Indian National Congress candidate Sarat Rout by a margin of 2,403 votes.

Notes

References

Assembly constituencies of Odisha
Jajpur district